Elisabetta Dessy (born 28 November 1957) is an Italian model, actress, and swimmer who competed in the 1976 Summer Olympics.

Biography 

Elisabetta Dessy was born in Rome, Italy. She is the first of four children born to countess Amalia Acqua, an Italian aristocrat, and her husband Giorgio Dessy, an Air Force captain.

She was a member of the National swimming team from 1971 to 1976. Dessy performed the 100 m breaststroke and 100 m freestyle at the 1974 European Aquatics Championships. She was part of the National team during the Latin Swimming Cup in Marseille 1974, Las Palmas 1975 and  Acapulco 1976; she also participated at the Five Nations Swimming Championships between 1973 and 1976 in Järfälla, Minsk, Erfurt and Nice.

Elisabetta Dessy was on the  4 × 100 m freestyle relay team that won the gold medal at the Mediterranean Games in 1975 in Algiers, while in the 100 m freestyle, she won the bronze medal.

As captain of the Italian Swimming team, she took part in the 4 × 100 m mixed relay during the Olympic Games in Montreal in 1976, setting the new Italian record during the semifinals. She was Italian Champion of the 100 m freestyle in 1974, 1975 and 1976, in the 4 × 100 m freestyle relay  in 1972 and 1973, and in the mixed relay 4 x 100.

Modeling career 

After the 1976 Summer Olympics Dessy started modeling between Milan, Paris and New York as a runway model. She has walked the catwalk for designers such as Valentino, Gucci, Gianni Versace, Armani, Fendi, Emilio Pucci, Salvatore Ferragamo, Roberto Capucci, Irene Galitzine, Missoni and Brioni.

She also appeared in the jewelry advertising campaigns for Tiffany & Co. and Van Cleef & Arpels.

In 1982 she starred alongside Vic Morrow and Fred Williamson in Enzo G Castellari's film 1990: The Bronx Warriors as Witch.

Elisabetta Dessy returned modeling in 2018, walking for Gattinoni, Erika Cavallini and Maison Margiela. In the same year she also starred in the advertising campaigns of Mango, Enel, Hilton, Yoox, Farfetch and Frette .

In 2019, she also appeared on the cover of Vanity Fair's December issue by Esther Haase and Simone Guidarelli.

References

1957 births
Living people
Swimmers from Rome
Italian female breaststroke swimmers
Italian female freestyle swimmers
Olympic swimmers of Italy
Swimmers at the 1976 Summer Olympics
Mediterranean Games gold medalists for Italy
Mediterranean Games bronze medalists for Italy
Swimmers at the 1975 Mediterranean Games
Actresses from Rome
Italian film actresses
Italian female models
Mediterranean Games medalists in swimming
Models from Rome
20th-century Italian women
21st-century Italian women